Oliver Frank Schniederjans (born June 15, 1993) is an American professional golfer. He was a three-time NCAA All-American at Georgia Tech. He is a former number one ranked amateur golfer in the world.

Amateur career
Schniederjans was born in Dallas, Texas, to Oliver and Linda Schniederjans. He lived briefly in North Andover, Massachusetts, and grew up in Powder Springs, Georgia. He graduated in 2010 from Harrison High School in Kennesaw, Georgia, and played college golf at Georgia Tech.

As a junior, Schniederjans won five of six events leading up to the NCAA Division I Championship, where he finished runner-up after a three-hole playoff. He won the 2014 Mark H. McCormack Medal after reaching number one in the World Amateur Golf Ranking, a position he held for 41 consecutive weeks. A two-time Atlantic Coast Conference (ACC) Player of the Year, Schniederjans was named first-team All-American following his junior and senior seasons and played for the U.S. Palmer Cup team in 2014 and 2015.

He played his first PGA Tour event at the 2015 Valspar Championship, missing the cut. As the McCormack winner, he earned exemptions into the 2015 U.S. Open and the 2015 Open Championship, after which he turned professional. He made his professional debut at the 2015 RBC Canadian Open.

Amateur wins
2009 Polo Golf Junior Classic, Jones Cup Junior Invitational
2013 Carpet Capital Collegiate (tie), U.S. Collegiate Championship
2014 Valspar Collegiate, Robert Kepler Invitational (tie), ACC Championship, Carpet Capital Collegiate

Source:

Professional wins (1)

Web.com Tour wins (1)

Web.com Tour playoff record (1–1)

Results in major championships

CUT = missed the half-way cut
"T" = tied

Results in The Players Championship

"T" indicates a tie for a place

U.S. national team appearances
Amateur
Junior Ryder Cup: 2010 (winners)
Palmer Cup:  2014, 2015 (winners)

See also
2016 Web.com Tour Finals graduates

References

External links

Profile on Georgia Tech's official athletic site

American male golfers
Georgia Tech Yellow Jackets men's golfers
PGA Tour golfers
Korn Ferry Tour graduates
Golfers from Dallas
Golfers from Georgia (U.S. state)
People from Powder Springs, Georgia
Sportspeople from Cobb County, Georgia
1993 births
Living people